Churchwell is a surname. Notable people with the name include:

 Donnis Churchwell (1936–2010), American football offensive tackle
 Robert Churchwell (born 1972) American basketball player
 Sarah Churchwell (born 1970) is an American-born academic
 William Montgomery Churchwell, American politician and a member of the United States House of Representatives

See also
 Churchill (disambiguation)